San Miguel Petapa also known as Petapa is a city and municipality in the Guatemala department of Guatemala, located south of Guatemala City. The city has a population of 129,124 according to the 2018 census.

History

Monastery and doctrine of Order of Preachers 

After the conquest, the Spanish crown focused on the Catholic indoctrination of the natives. Human settlements founded by royal missionaries in the New World were called "Indian doctrines" or simply "doctrines". Originally, friars had only temporary missions: teach the Catholic faith to the natives, and then transfer the settlements to secular parishes, just like the ones that existed in Spain at the time; the friars were supposed to teach Spanish and Catholicism to the natives. And when the natives were ready, they could start living in parishes and contribute with mandatory tithing, just like the people in Spain.

But this plan never materialized, mainly because the Spanish crown lost control of the regular orders as soon as their friars set course to America.  Shielded by their apostolic privileges granted to convert natives into Catholicism, the missionaries only responded to their order local authorities, and never to that of the Spanish government or the secular bishops. The orders local authorities, in turn, only dealt with their own order and not with the Spanish crown.  Once a doctrine had been established, the protected their own economic interests, even against those of the King and thus, the doctrines became Indian towns that remains unaltered for the rest of the Spanish colony.

The doctrines were founded at the friars discretion, given that they were completely at liberty to settle communities provided the main purpose was to eventually transfer it as a secular parish which would be tithing of the bishop.  In reality, what happened was that the doctrines grew uncontrollably and were never transferred to any secular parish; they formed around the place where the friars had their monastery and from there, they would go out to preach to settlements that belong to the doctrine and were called "annexes", "visits" or "visit towns".  Therefore, the doctrines had three main characteristics:
 they were independent from external controls (both ecclesiastical and secular)
 were run by a group of friars
 had a relatively larger number of annexes.

The main characteristic of the doctrines was that they were run by a group of friars, because it made sure that the community system would continue without any issue when one of the members died.

In 1638, the Order of Preachers split their large doctrines —which meant large economic benefits for them— in groups centered around each one of their six monasteries;   Petapa's doctrine was assigned to the Amatitlán Convent. In 1754, the Order of Preachers had to transfer all of their doctrines and convents to the secular clergy, as part of the Bourbon reforms.

Amatitlán Department creation 

After the independence of Central America, and during governor Mariano Rivera Paz time in office, a decree issue on 6 November 1839, created a new independent district called Amatitlán which also included Palín and Villa Nueva. The decree says: 
 "The city of Amatitlán, San Cristóbal Palín, Villa Nueva, San Miguel and Santa Inés Petapa and all the annexed locations to these settlements will form an independent district for its political government and will be in charge of a Lieutenant Corregidor, who will act according to the applicable law starting on 2 October of this year and will earn a thousand pesos a year". 
 "In the same district there will be a local court to impart justice".

The district changed its name to Amatitlán Department according to the executive order of 8 May 1866 of field Marshall Vicente Cerna y Cerna government.

Amatitlán Department dissolution and creation of the Amatitlán municipality 

The Amatitlán Department was abolished by decree 2081 of 29 April 1935 of president general Jorge Ubico regime. This decree reads literally:

Despite their movement in the 18th century to its present place, the religious relics of the Order of Preachers were taken from the original settlement, including the "Señor Sepultado" (The Buried Lord) sculpture, which is five-century old.

Traditions 

San Miguel Petapa also has two main traditional holidays, one of which is celebrated in February and is appointed to Our Lady of the Rosary. Besides the solemn procession, there are praises appearances (popular religious theatrical plays). The other holiday is dedicated to Saint Michael (Archangel).

A tradition amongst Ladinos (mestizo people) in the municipality, is the Flowers Dance, which consists of a dance in which all contestants are rolling up, first, and unrolling later in a specific tree. Meanwhile music and recited verses are executed at the same time. This tradition was begun in the old Spanish capital, Santiago de Guatemala (the Antigua Guatemala of present-day) from where it was extended to the nearest villages. Years after, was taken to the new capital, Nueva Guatemala de la Asuncion. Today this folk dance is executed in other municipalities of the department of Guatemala, such as San Raymundo, Mixco, San Juan Sacatepequez, San Jose Pinula and Villa Nueva.

Sports
Deportivo Petapa football club play in the second tier of Guatemalan football. Their home venue is the Estadio Julio Armando Cobar. Also, Deportivo Mixco have used the stadium while a new stadium of their own was built.

Climate 

San Miguel Petapa has tropical climate (Köppen: Aw).

Geographic location

San Miguel Petapa is completely surrounded by Guatemala Department municipalities:

See also
 
 
 List of places in Guatemala

Notes and references

References

Bibliography

 
 
 
 

Municipalities of the Guatemala Department